Riccardo Ghedin and Claudio Grassi are the holders, but chose not to compete.

Sergei Bubka and Marco Chiudinelli won the tournament, beating Chen Ti and Huang Liang-chi 6–3, 6–4

Seeds

Draw

Draw

References
 Main Draw

President's Cup (tennis)- Doubles
2014 Doubles